Peter Frits Bots (born 25 January 1942) is a retired Dutch rower. He competed in the double sculls event at the 1964 Summer Olympics, together with Max Alwin, and finished in eighth place.

References

1942 births
Living people
Dutch male rowers
Olympic rowers of the Netherlands
Rowers at the 1964 Summer Olympics
Rowers from Amsterdam